Villa for Sale (Hungarian: Ez a villa eladó) is a 1935 Hungarian comedy film directed by Géza von Cziffra and starring Ernő Verebes, Ida Turay and Gyula Kabos. After he goes away on holiday, a wealthy man's servant accidentally puts his villa up for sale.

Cast
Ernő Verebes as György Hódy 
Ida Turay as Anni 
Gyula Kabos as József Buckó 
Lili Berky as Tóni néni 
Rózsi Csikós as Teri 
Gyula Gózon as Rizling, Buckó's brother
István Somló as Betörõ 
Sándor Pethes as Dani, Betörõ's brother
Gusztáv Pártos as Bedõ úr 
Tivadar Bilicsi as Tivadar Gereblyei 
László Keleti as Stuttering buyer 
Gyula Justh as János, the butler

External links

Hungarian comedy films
Films directed by Géza von Cziffra
Hungarian black-and-white films
1935 comedy films